Louisiana Highway 52 (LA 52) is a state highway located in St. Charles Parish, Louisiana.  It runs  in a north–south direction along Paul Maillard Road from U.S. Highway 90 (US 90) and LA 633 in Boutte to LA 18 in Luling.

The route serves as the main north–south thoroughfare of Luling, located on the west bank of the Mississippi River, and connects it with US 90 at Boutte.

Route description
From the south, LA 52 begins at an intersection with US 90 (the future corridor of I-49) in Boutte.  US 90 connects to New Orleans to the east and Houma to the southwest.  Directly opposite the intersection is the northern terminus of LA 633 (Magnolia Ridge Road).  LA 52 heads north on Paul Maillard Road, immediately intersecting LA 631 (Old Spanish Trail) and crossing the BNSF/Union Pacific Railroad tracks at grade.   later, LA 52 crosses from Boutte into Luling, passing through a largely residential neighborhood with scattered businesses.  After another , LA 52 has another grade crossing with the Union Pacific Railroad.  The highway ends shortly afterward at an intersection with LA 18 (River Road).  LA 18 runs along the west bank levee of the Mississippi River and connects to the Hale Boggs Memorial Bridge on I-310, a distance of  upriver.

LA 52 is an undivided, two-lane highway for its entire length. The route is classified as an urban collector by the Louisiana Department of Transportation and Development (La DOTD) with an average daily traffic volume of 8,500 in 2013.

History
In the original Louisiana Highway system in use between 1921 and 1955, the modern LA 52 was originally designated as part of State Route 2, which followed the Old Spanish Trail auto trail throughout the state of Louisiana.  In 1926, it became part of the original route of US 90, which duplicated Route 2 throughout the state.  In April 1941, US 90 was moved onto its current alignment between Boutte and the Huey P. Long Bridge, bypassing the winding River Road.  Route 2 was moved along with it, and the former alignment through Luling carried the designation of Route 1092 until the 1955 Louisiana Highway renumbering.

LA 52 was created with the 1955 renumbering, and its route has remained the same to the present day.

Future
Under this plan of "right-sizing" the state highway system, the entire route of LA 52 is proposed for deletion as it does not meet a significant interurban travel function.

Major intersections

See also

References

External links

Maps / GIS Data Homepage, Louisiana Department of Transportation and Development

0052
Transportation in St. Charles Parish, Louisiana